The Dominikan Ambassador next the Holy See is the Ambassador of the government in Santo Domingo to the Holy See, he is concurrently accredited as ambassador to the Governments in Athens, Nicosia and to the Order of Malta.

References

Holy See
Dominican Republic
Ambassadors